Brookland Hall is a centre for community mental health services in St Werburghs, Bristol, United Kingdom. It is managed by Avon and Wiltshire Mental Health Partnership NHS Trust.

History
After the closure of Brookland Methodist Church on Conduit Place in 1971, the site was cleared and after the works on the M32 motorway were completed in 1975 the site was made available for the construction of a small community mental health facility.

Services
Brookland Hall is the base for the following teams:

 Crisis Service (Bristol Central)
 Recovery Team (Bristol Central)
 Bristol Deaf Mental Health Services
 Bristol Primary Care Liaison Service

See also
 Petherton Resource Centre - South Bristol services
 Healthcare in Bristol

References

Psychiatric hospitals in England
Hospitals in Bristol
NHS hospitals in England